Dragmarpo Ri is a mountain on the border between Nepal and People's Republic of China.

Location 

References

Mountains of the Bagmati Province
Mountains of Tibet
China–Nepal border
International mountains of Asia
Six-thousanders of the Himalayas